William Otis Clark (August 16, 1872 – November 13, 1932) was a professional baseball first baseman for the New York Giants and Pittsburgh Pirates of Major League Baseball between 1895 and 1899.

In 350 games over five seasons, Clark posted a .286 batting average (366-for-1280) with 188 runs, 2 home runs and 199 RBI. He recorded a .983 fielding percentage as a first baseman.

External links

1872 births
1932 deaths
Major League Baseball first basemen
Baseball players from Pennsylvania
New York Giants (NL) players
19th-century baseball players
Allentown Colts players
Hazleton Barons players
Scranton Coal Heavers players
New York Metropolitans (minor league) players
Milwaukee Brewers (minor league) players
Pittsburgh Pirates players
Burials at Allegheny Cemetery